Echeandía Canton is a canton of Ecuador, located in the Bolívar Province.  Its capital is the town of Echeandía.  Its population at the 2001 census was 10,951.

Demographics
Ethnic groups as of the Ecuadorian census of 2010:
Mestizo  85.5%
White  4.7%
Indigenous  4.4%
Montubio  3.5%
Afro-Ecuadorian  1.8%
Other  0.2%

References

Cantons of Bolívar Province (Ecuador)